Eric William Heaton (15 October 1920 – 24 August 1996) was an Old Testament scholar and a former Dean of Christ Church, Oxford (1979–1991).

Eric Heaton's father was a sheep farmer at Long Preston in the West Riding of Yorkshire.

He was educated at Ermysted's Grammar School and Christ's College, Cambridge (1939–1942) and a curate in Durham. He was appointed Chaplain of Gonville and Caius College, Cambridge in 1945. After seven years he was appointed a Canon of Salisbury Cathedral.

He was Fellow, Chaplain, and Tutor in Theology of St John's College, Oxford (1960–1974) and Senior Tutor (1967–1973). He was Dean of Durham Cathedral (1974–1979).

In 1951, he married Rachel Dodd, daughter of the eminent theologian C. H. Dodd whose work on the translation of the New English Bible Heaton much admired.

Notable works by Heaton
The Book of Daniel - Introduction and Commentary (1956)
Everyday Life in Old Testament Times (1956)
The Old Testament Prophets (1958)
Commentary on the Sunday Lessons — New Lectionary Year One (1959)
The Hebrew Kingdoms (1968)
Solomon's New Men: The Emergence of Ancient Israel as a National State (1974) 
School Tradition of the Old Testament (1994)

External links
Hugh Rice’s Obituary for 'The Rev. Eric Heaton' from The Independent on Sunday, Friday 30 August 1996.

1920 births
1996 deaths
Deans of Christ Church, Oxford
Alumni of Christ's College, Cambridge
20th-century English Anglican priests
Fellows of St John's College, Oxford
Fellows of Gonville and Caius College, Cambridge
Deans of Durham
People educated at Ermysted's Grammar School